Pitigliano Cathedral is a Roman Catholic cathedral  dedicated to Saints Peter and Paul in the town of Pitigliano, in the region of Tuscany, Italy.

It is currently the episcopal seat of the Diocese of Pitigliano-Sovana-Orbetello, established in 1986.

History 
The parish church of San Pietro in Pitigliano was made a collegiate church in 1509, and then refurbished under count Niccola III degli Orsini, when the dedication was changed to Saints Peter and Paul (Santi Pietro e Paolo). In 1844, the church became the cathedral of the Diocese of Sovana,  which was accordingly renamed on 11 January 1844 as the Diocese of Sovana–Pitigliano, and remained the cathedral after the see was again renamed on 25 March 1925 as the Diocese of Sovana–Pitigliano–Orbetello. The see was renamed once more on 30 June 1986, moving Pitigliano to the first position in the present diocesan title: Diocese of Pitigliano–Sovana–Orbetello.

Description 
The church was restored in 1692–1702. In 1717 the Romanesque altar was replaced by a new Baroque altar. The west front also dates from the 18th century. The cathedral has an altarpiece in the choir, depicting the Enthroned Madonna with Saints Peter and Francis (1494) by Guidoccio Cozzarelli. In addition, in 1885, Pietro Aldi painted two large canvases, Henry IV at Canossa and the Life of Ildeprando in Sovana.

References

External links 
 GCatholic with Google satellite photo/map

Roman Catholic cathedrals in Italy
Romanesque architecture in Tuscany
Baroque architecture in Tuscany
18th-century Roman Catholic church buildings in Italy
Roman Catholic churches completed in 1702
Churches in the province of Grosseto
Cathedrals in Tuscany
Pitigliano